The 1963–64 Hong Kong First Division League season was the 53rd since its establishment.

League table

External links
1963–64 Hong Kong First Division table (RSSSF)

Hong Kong First Division League seasons
Hong
football